Rose of the Rio Grande is a 1938 American Western film directed by William Nigh and starring Movita Castaneda as Rosita de la Torre.

Plot 
When killers come after her wealthy brother Don Jose (Alvarado), she narrowly escapes with Sebastian (Renaldo) and hides out under the guise of a cabaret singer. After her ruse is discovered by the real cabaret singer Anita (Basquette), Rosita is rescued by El Gato (Carroll).

Cast
Movita Castaneda as Rosita de la Torre
John Carroll as El Gato/Don Ramon de Peralta
Duncan Renaldo as Sebastian
Don Alvarado as Don Jose de la Torre
Antonio Moreno as Captain Lugo
Lina Basquette as Anita
 George Cleveland as Pedro
 Gino Corrado as Castro
 Martin Garralaga as 	Luis
 Rosa Turich as 	Maria

References

External links
 
 
 
 

1938 films
1938 Western (genre) films
American black-and-white films
American swashbuckler films
Films set in Mexico
Films set in the 1830s
American Western (genre) films
1938 drama films
Monogram Pictures films
Films directed by William Nigh
Films based on works by Johnston McCulley
1930s English-language films
1930s American films